Park Jeong-ah (born 26 March 1993) is a South Korean female volleyball player. 
She is part of the South Korea women's national volleyball team.

Park was appointed as the new captain of the Korean Women's Volleyball National Team since Kim Yeon-koung stepped back.

Clubs
  Hwaseong IBK Altos (2011~2017)
  Gyeongbuk Gimcheon Hi-pass (2017~)

Career
She went to Namsung Women's Highschool.

In 2009, she made her first senior national team debut in age 16 at 2009 FIVB Volleyball Women's World Grand Champions Cup.

She currently plays for Korean club Gyeongbuk Gimcheon Hi-pass since 2017 after her contract with Hwaseong IBK Altos expired.

She participated at the 2016 Summer Olympics, and the 2010 FIVB Volleyball Women's World Championship.

She plays as an Outside Hitter. She played as an Opposite Hitter at the 2018 FIVB Women's Volleyball Nations League. At the 2015 FIVB Volleyball Women's World Cup she played as a Middle Blocker in some matches.

Park participated at the 2020 Summer Olympics which took place in Tokyo, playing an important role, being the twelfth best scorer of the competition with 82 points and a 31.19% rate of efficiency.

Individual Awards
 2010 Asian Junior Championship — "Best Scorer"
 2011–12 Korean V-League – "New Face Award"
 2014–15 Korean V-League – "Best Outside Spiker"
 2015–16 Korean V-League – "Player of the Round (6R)"
 2016 KOVO Cup - "Most Impressive Player (MVP)"
 2016–17 Korean V-League – "Player of the Round (1R)"
 2017–18 Korean V-League – "Finals MVP"
 2018–19 Korean V-League – "Best Outside Spiker"
 2021-22 Korean V-League - "Best Ouside Spiker"

References

External links
Park Jeong-ah at KOVO 
Park Jeong-ah at IBK Sports 
 http://www.fivb.org/EN/volleyball/competitions/WorldGrandPrix/2014/Players.asp?Tourn=WGP2014a&Team=KOR&No=131893
 http://worldoqt.japan.2016.women.fivb.com/en/teams/kor-korea/players/jeongah-park?id=50245
 http://worldcup.2015.women.fivb.com/en/competition/teams/kor-korea/players/jeongah-park?id=47098
http://www.zimbio.com/Jeong-Ah+Park/pictures/pro
http://www.gettyimages.com/detail/news-photo/south-koreas-park-jeong-ah-spikes-the-ball-over-brazils-ana-news-photo/93000097#south-koreas-park-jeongah-spikes-the-ball-over-brazils-ana-tiemi-picture-id93000097

1993 births
Living people
South Korean women's volleyball players
People from Busan
Sportspeople from Busan
Asian Games medalists in volleyball
Volleyball players at the 2014 Asian Games
Volleyball players at the 2018 Asian Games
Asian Games gold medalists for South Korea
Asian Games bronze medalists for South Korea
Olympic volleyball players of South Korea
Volleyball players at the 2016 Summer Olympics
Medalists at the 2014 Asian Games
Medalists at the 2018 Asian Games
Volleyball players at the 2020 Summer Olympics